Nikolas Diego "Niko" Tsakiris (born June 19, 2005) is an American professional soccer player who plays as a midfielder for Major League Soccer club San Jose Earthquakes.

Career

Youth 
Tsakiris started playing academy soccer with De Anza Force. In 2015, at the age of 10, he moved to Florida to play with IMG Academy. A couple years later in 2017 he returned to the Bay Area and began play with the San Jose Earthquakes academy for four years, until receiving his first professional contract with San Jose at the beginning of 2022.

Professional 
On January 13, 2022, Tsakiris signed as a Homegrown Player for Major League Soccer side San Jose Earthquakes. He was the tenth homegrown signed by the Quakes in their history and the fifth youngest player they had ever signed.

Tsakiris made his professional debut with San Jose on March 12, 2022, in an MLS match away to Philadelphia Union. Tsakiris became the third youngest player to appear in MLS for San Jose. Tsakiris made his professional start in San Jose's matchup against Bay Cities FC in the third round of the 2022 U.S. Open Cup. Tsakiris also scored his first professional goal in the 83rd minute of the match.

International 

On March 3, 2020, Tsakriris was called up to a training camp for the United States national under-15 team. On April 20, 2022, Tsakiris was called up to a training camp for the United States national under-20 team. He was the second youngest player called for the camp.

Personal life 
Niko's father is Shaun Tsakiris, an American former soccer player who is currently an assistant coach of the US under-20 men's soccer team and the director of Los Gatos United academy. He is of Greek and Portuguese descent.

Honors
United States U20
CONCACAF U-20 Championship: 2022

References

External links 
 

2005 births
Living people
American soccer players
American people of Greek descent
American people of Portuguese descent
Association football midfielders
Homegrown Players (MLS)
Major League Soccer players
MLS Next Pro players
People from Saratoga, California
San Jose Earthquakes players
Soccer players from California
United States men's under-20 international soccer players
De Anza Force players